Targioniina is a subtribe of armored scale insects.

Genera
Fisanotargionia
Genistaspis
Schizotargionia
Targaspidiotus
Targionia
Targionidea

References

Aspidiotini